Costa Masnaga is a comune (municipality) in the Province of Lecco in the Italian region Lombardy, located about  northeast of Milan and about  southwest of Lecco.

Costa Masnaga borders the following municipalities: Bulciago, Garbagnate Monastero, Lambrugo, Merone, Molteno, Nibionno, Rogeno.

In 1789, the villages of Tregolo, Brenno Della Torre and Centemero were merged together to form the modern day single town known as Costa Masnaga.

References

External links
 Official website

Cities and towns in Lombardy